Plectrocnemia is a genus of tube maker caddisflies in the family Polycentropodidae. There are more than 120 described species in Plectrocnemia.

See also
 List of Plectrocnemia species

References

Further reading

External links

 

Trichoptera genera
Articles created by Qbugbot